The International University of La Rioja (UNIR) is a private open university in Spain focused on online education, based in Logroño, La Rioja. Also has presence in Mexico, Colombia, Ecuador and Peru. In December 2019, the institution had more than 45,000 distance learning external students, 12,000 of them overseas students. UNIR offers 37 university degrees, more than 80 master's degrees, 77 proprietary degrees, 16 Advanced Studies and 3 doctoral programmes. The university is composed of six departments (Education, Law, Management and Communication, Humanities and Social Sciences, Health Sciences and Engineering). It also has an Official Language School and a School of Doctoral programmes.

History
UNIR started its academic activity in 2009. The university follows the general provisions established by the Spanish Universities Act (LOU), the guidelines issued by the European Union and the norms set by the Spanish Government and the Regional Government of La Rioja. Its structure, organization and operation have been designed according to the European Higher Education Area (EHEA) parameters and requirements.

With the 21% of its enrolled students distributed in 79 countries worldwide, the Universidad Internacional de La Rioja aims to become a global university and an international academic reference. 60,000 students have graduated from UNIR from its inception to the middle of the 2018–2019 academic school year. This university created the role of personal tutors in modern distance education. These personal tutors support students by arranging different meetings with them in order to follow-up their learning and encourage them to meet the challenges and opportunities of university life. The personal tutoring system aims to be completely adapted to the personal and professional circumstances of each student.

On 8 March 2019 the Universidad Internacional de La Rioja, an active member of the regional Proeduca Altus group, became a publicly traded company in the Mercado Alternativo Bursátil (MAB) of Spain. In 2020 UNIR launched its institute for digital experts, EDIX, specialized in high-employability University Expert Certificates aimed at professionals who want to upgrade skills and retrain during their working life through programmes with a strong digital and technological component whose objective is to develop digital experts.

UNIR in Latin America
In 2013 UNIR adapted its academic offer in order to internationalize the courses taught in Spain to the Spanish-speaker alumni from all over the world.

Mexico
UNIR México is a private university officially recognized by the Mexican Secretariat of Public Education (SEP). Its academics are entirely adapted to Mexico's standards. Its bachelor's and master's degrees are fully accredited and are registered with the national education system of the Secretariat of Public Education (SEP) in Mexico. The International University of La Rioja in Mexico offers 5 Bachelor's degrees and 21 Master's degrees, in addition to official European masters and diplomas.

Colombia
With headquarters in Bogotá, UNIR offers online teaching and more than 1,300 courses recognized by the National Education Ministry of the Government of Colombia thanks to an agreement between Spain and Colombia about the mutual recognition of academic degrees and programmes. UNIR Colombia has more than 5,000 students enrolled and 8,000 graduates. Furthermore, the Fundación Universitaria Internacional de La Rioja-UNIR Colombia, constituted under the Colombian law, was officially approved by the National Education Ministry in 2017. UNIR Colombia has four undergraduate programmes.

Ecuador
In July 2016 UNIR was the first university successfully evaluated under the new online universities evaluation procedure defined by the SENESCYT of Ecuador, which was based on the regulation for open studies and academic programmes published by the Higher Education Council of Ecuador. By the end of 2019 UNIR Ecuador had more than 9,000 students.

Other regions of Latin America and US
In mid-2019 the Proeduca Group, which UNIR is part of, acquired the Marconi International University (MIU) sited in Florida, in the United States of America, and the Neumann Business School located in Lima, Peru.

Major publications
Revista Española de Pedagogía
IJIMAI

References

Distance education institutions based in Spain
International University of La Rioja
University
Educational institutions established in 2008
2008 establishments in Spain
Open universities
Private universities and colleges in Spain
Universities and colleges in Spain